HGTV Design Star All Stars is a spin-off series based on HGTV Design Star. It features 6 designers from the first seven seasons of the original series. Host and mentor David Bromstad and incumbent judges Vern Yip and Genevieve Gorder will all return to their respective positions for this competition. The season premiered on HGTV on July 31, 2012, a week following the conclusion of the seventh season of the parent series.

Designers

1 Age at the time of the show's filming

Contestant progress

 (WINNER) The designer won the competition.
 (RUNNER-UP) The designer received second place.
 (WIN) The designer was selected as the winner of the episode's elimination challenge.
 (HIGH) The designer was selected as one of the top entries in the elimination challenge, but did not win.
 (IN) The designer advanced to the next challenge, but was not selected as a top nor a bottom entry in the elimination challenge.
 (LOW) The designer was selected as one of the bottom entries in the elimination challenge, but was not the final contestant to move on to the next round
 (LOW) The designer was selected as one of the bottom entries in the elimination challenge and was the final contestant to move on to the next round.
 (OUT) The designer was eliminated from the competition.

2010s American reality television series
2012 American television series debuts
2012 American television series endings
HGTV original programming
American television spin-offs
Reality television spin-offs